Yitzhak ha-Sangari was the rabbi who purportedly converted the Khazar royalty to Judaism, according to medieval Jewish sources. According to D. M. Dunlop, "the name Isaac Sangari is perhaps not attested before the 13th century, when he is mentioned by Nahmanides."

In Sefer ha-Emunot ("Book of Beliefs"; early 15th century), Rabbi Shem Tov ibn Shem Tov wrote: 

I have been preceded by Rabbi Yitzhak ha-Sangeri, companion [haver] to the king of the Khazars, who converted through that sage a number of years ago in Turgema [land of Togarmah, i.e. the Turks], as is known from several books. The [rabbinic] responsa and the valuable and wise sayings of this sage, which show his wisdom in Torah and Kabbalah and other fields are scattered in [different books] in Arabic. The sage Rabbi Yehuda Halevi, the poet, of Spain, found them and put them into his book, in Arabic, and it has been translated into our language [Hebrew]...

Shem Tov's work was cited by Judah Moscato in his work Kol Yehuda. If the medieval sources are to be believed, Yitzhak was a famous rabbi of the Middle Ages. A learned man, he was versed in Arabic as well as Hebrew and Aramaic. D. M. Dunlop tentatively identified him with the region of Sangaros, in western Anatolia (not far from the ancient site of Troy). 

Yitzhak's historicity is difficult to determine. A great deal of discussion among scholars has not yet conclusively established when or even if he lived, nor are any details of his ministry among the Khazars given in the Khazar Correspondence or the Schechter Letter. In some Hebrew works he is referred to as Yitzhak al-Mangari. 

Avraham Firkovich claimed that Yitzhak was a Karaite scholar, and "discovered" tombstones in Crimea of Yitzhak (actually Zembra's) and his wife. This is unlikely given the esteem in which he was held by Rabbinic authors and the fact that Khazar king's Judaism was almost certainly not Karaite. In any event, the ha-Sangari tombstones were later determined to be forgeries. Among the documents in Firkovich's collections are poems allegedly written by Rabbi Yitzhak. A few Israeli scholars, such as Menashe Goldelman of the Hebrew University, have declared these to be authentic, but their assertions are questioned by other scholars.

Yitzhak ha-Sangari appears in the Dictionary of the Khazars novel.

See also
Bulan (Khazar)
Khazar Correspondence
Schechter Letter
Serach (Khazar)

Sources
Douglas M. Dunlop, The History of the Jewish Khazars, Princeton, N.J.: Princeton University Press, 1954.
Norman Golb and Omeljan Pritsak, Khazarian Hebrew Documents of the Tenth Century. Ithaca: Cornell Univ. Press, 1982.

Medieval rabbis
Khazars
Legendary people